Mateus Garcia Borges (born 25 June 1983), known as Mateus Borges or simply Mateus, is a Brazilian footballer who plays as an attacking midfielder for Taubaté.

External links

1983 births
Living people
Brazilian footballers
Association football midfielders
Campeonato Brasileiro Série A players
Campeonato Brasileiro Série B players
Botafogo Futebol Clube (SP) players
Associação Desportiva São Caetano players
Esporte Clube Vitória players
Clube Náutico Capibaribe players
Sertãozinho Futebol Clube players
Goiás Esporte Clube players
Vila Nova Futebol Clube players
Clube Atlético Sorocaba players
Esporte Clube Pelotas players
Comercial Futebol Clube (Ribeirão Preto) players
Esporte Clube Taubaté players
Primeira Liga players
C.F. Estrela da Amadora players
Vitória F.C. players
S.C. Olhanense players
Brazilian expatriate footballers
Brazilian expatriate sportspeople in Portugal
Expatriate footballers in Portugal
People from Ribeirão Preto
Footballers from São Paulo (state)